The Club is an Australian reality television show about an Australian rules football sporting side, the Hammerheads, which was screened on the Seven Network in 2002 for one series. It was seen as a way for Seven to stay involved in football after losing the broadcast rights to the Australian Football League after the 2001 season.

The show featured a handpicked team of amateur footballers coached by former VFL/AFL legend David Rhys-Jones which played against various Victorian football sides from the Western Region Football League second division, following the trials and tribulations of its players.

Unlike normal clubs, the home audience were able to influence who was selected in the team each week by voting to keep their favourite players in the side. Viewers also got to vote on many of the club's other key aspects including its name, coach, captain and song.

The show was considered trailblazing and generated a cult following, with several crowds at games featuring the Hammerheads pushing 5,000 spectators and many claiming the Hammerheads as their second favourite sporting team.  After finishing the regular season in third position, the Hammerheads went on to win the Grand Final and claim the flag in their first – and only – season.

Despite the show's success, it did not return to television.

Controversy
The show also achieved its share of controversy and publicity. The Hammerheads attempted to have a woman, Debbie Lee, play on their team in competition games but were ultimately stopped by the league. There were also criticisms of personal attacks by coach Rhys-Jones on players.

Seven Sport
2000s Australian reality television series
Television shows set in Victoria (Australia)
2002 Australian television series debuts
2002 Australian television series endings
Australian sports television series